Joseph James Cheeseman (March 7, 1843 – November 12, 1896) was the 12th president of Liberia.  Born at Edina in Grand Bassa County, he was elected three times on the True Whig ticket. Cheeseman was educated at Liberia College (now University of Liberia).

Presidency (1892–1896)

Economy
In the decades after 1868, escalating economic difficulties weakened the state's dominance over the coastal indigenous population. Conditions worsened, as the cost of imports was far greater than the income generated by exports of coffee, rice, palm oil, sugarcane, and timber. Liberia tried desperately to modernize its largely agricultural economy.

Territorial conflicts
In 1892, the French forced Liberia to cede to the Ivory Coast the area beyond Cape Palmas which Liberia had long controlled.  President Johnson (1884–92) was responsible for this negotiation but retired before the treaty was signed. 
The boundaries of Liberia were beginning to be officially established from this year onwards.
Whenever the British and French seemed intent on enlarging at Liberia's expense the neighboring territories they already controlled, periodic appearances by U.S. warships helped discourage encroachment, even though successive American administrations rejected appeals from Monrovia for more forceful support.

Ethnic uprisings
Some tribal people living in the hinterland of Montserrado County and further north were at war since the mid-1880s and would stay at war until the late 1890s. On the one hand there was a war between Gola and Mandingo over trading routes in the region, while various factions of the Gola were fighting with each other too.  

Ethnic struggles with the Kru, Gola, and Grebo tribe who resented incursions into their territory occurred several times during Cheeseman's reign. Cheeseman initially attempted to settle tribal conflicts by peaceful negotiations. One notable uprising occurred in 1893 when the Grebo tribe attacked the settlement of Harper. Troops and the gunboat Gorronomah were sent to defeat the tribesmen.

Death
President Cheeseman died in office on November 12, 1896, and vice president William David Coleman served the remainder of the term and well as another four years until 1900. Cheeseman was interred at the City Cemetery of Monrovia.

See also
History of Liberia

References

External links
see History of Liberia, external links
 

Americo-Liberian people
Presidents of Liberia
1843 births
1896 deaths
Burials in Liberia
University of Liberia alumni
True Whig Party politicians
People from Grand Bassa County
19th-century Liberian politicians